The H.M. Stationery Office Collection is a collection of British excise revenue material including National Savings and National Insurance stamps that forms part of the British Library Philatelic Collections. It was received from H.M.S.O. between 1982 and 1992.

See also
Contributions Agency Collection
Revenue Society
Revenue stamps of the United Kingdom

References

British Library Philatelic Collections
Revenue stamps
Philately of the United Kingdom
Taxation in the United Kingdom
Cinderella stamps